The 1998–99 New York Rangers season was the franchise's 73rd season. The Rangers missed the playoffs for a second consecutive season in what was Wayne Gretzky's final season in the National Hockey League.

Regular season

Final standings

The Great One retires

Wayne Gretzky's last NHL game in Canada was on April 16, 1999, in a 2–2 tie with the Ottawa Senators. His 1,487th and final game was a 2–1 overtime loss to the Pittsburgh Penguins which had Jaromir Jagr, a future Ranger captain, scoring the game-winning goal on April 18, 1999, at Madison Square Garden. The national anthems in that game were adjusted to accommodate Gretzky's departure. In place of "O Canada, we stand on guard for thee," Bryan Adams sang "We're going to miss you Wayne Gretzky." John Amirante changed lyrics in "The Star-Spangled Banner" from "the land of the free" to "the land of Wayne Gretzky." He scored his final point in this game, assisting on the lone New York goal scored by team captain Brian Leetch. Gretzky was named as the first, second and third star of both games; only Maurice Richard had such an honour previously, for his performance in a 1944 playoff game.

At the time of his retirement, Gretzky was the second-to-last former WHA player still active in professional hockey, Mark Messier being the last. Messier, himself a former Ranger who would return to spend his final four playing years there, along with other representatives of the great Edmonton Oilers dynasty of the 1980s, attended the game. Gretzky's final game was considered a "national retirement party" in Canada, and Bryan Adams' rendition of "O Canada" was like a "lullaby." As the final seconds ticked away, the crowd at Madison Square Garden gave him a standing ovation, capping off "an entirely satisfying, weekend-long going-away party" in Canada, as there would be "No Regretzkys."

Gretzky told Scott Morrison that the final game of his career was his greatest day. He recounted:

Schedule and results

|- align="center" bgcolor="#FFBBBB"
| 1 || 9 || Philadelphia Flyers || 1 - 0 || 0-1-0
|- align="center" bgcolor="#FFBBBB"
| 2 || 10 || @ Montreal Canadiens || 7 - 1 || 0-2-0
|- align="center" bgcolor="#FFBBBB"
| 3 || 12 || St. Louis Blues || 4 - 2 || 0-3-0
|- align="center" bgcolor="#FFBBBB"
| 4 || 16 || New Jersey Devils || 2 - 1 || 0-4-0
|- align="center" bgcolor="white"
| 5 || 17 || @ Pittsburgh Penguins || 3 - 3 OT || 0-4-1
|- align="center" bgcolor="#CCFFCC"
| 6 || 20 || Edmonton Oilers || 3 - 2 || 1-4-1
|- align="center" bgcolor="#CCFFCC"
| 7 || 22 || New York Islanders || 3 - 2 || 2-4-1
|- align="center" bgcolor="white"
| 8 || 24 || @ Philadelphia Flyers || 2 - 2 OT || 2-4-2
|- align="center" bgcolor="white"
| 9 || 27 || Buffalo Sabres || 0 - 0 OT || 2-4-3
|- align="center" bgcolor="#CCFFCC"
| 10 || 30 || Carolina Hurricanes || 1 - 0 || 3-4-3
|-

|- align="center" bgcolor="#FFBBBB"
| 11 || 3 || @ New Jersey Devils || 3 - 1 || 3-5-3
|- align="center" bgcolor="#FFBBBB"
| 12 || 4 || Montreal Canadiens || 4 - 1 || 3-6-3
|- align="center" bgcolor="white"
| 13 || 7 || @ Toronto Maple Leafs || 6 - 6 OT || 3-6-4
|- align="center" bgcolor="#CCFFCC"
| 14 || 10 || @ Tampa Bay Lightning || 10 - 2 || 4-6-4
|- align="center" bgcolor="#FFBBBB"
| 15 || 11 || @ Florida Panthers || 4 - 1 || 4-7-4
|- align="center" bgcolor="white"
| 16 || 13 || Boston Bruins || 3 - 3 OT || 4-7-5
|- align="center" bgcolor="#FFBBBB"
| 17 || 18 || @ Mighty Ducks of Anaheim || 3 - 1 || 4-8-5
|- align="center" bgcolor="#CCFFCC"
| 18 || 19 || @ Los Angeles Kings || 5 - 1 || 5-8-5
|- align="center" bgcolor="white"
| 19 || 21 || @ San Jose Sharks || 2 - 2 OT || 5-8-6
|- align="center" bgcolor="#FFBBBB"
| 20 || 25 || @ Buffalo Sabres || 4 - 2 || 5-9-6
|- align="center" bgcolor="white"
| 21 || 27 || @ Pittsburgh Penguins || 2 - 2 OT || 5-9-7
|- align="center" bgcolor="#CCFFCC"
| 22 || 29 || Nashville Predators || 5 - 1 || 6-9-7
|-

|- align="center" bgcolor="#CCFFCC"
| 23 || 1 || Florida Panthers || 5 - 4 OT || 7-9-7
|- align="center" bgcolor="#CCFFCC"
| 24 || 2 || @ New York Islanders || 3 - 2 || 8-9-7
|- align="center" bgcolor="#CCFFCC"
| 25 || 5 || @ Ottawa Senators || 2 - 1 || 9-9-7
|- align="center" bgcolor="#CCFFCC"
| 26 || 7 || Toronto Maple Leafs || 6 - 2 || 10-9-7
|- align="center" bgcolor="#FFBBBB"
| 27 || 9 || Colorado Avalanche || 2 - 1 || 10-10-7
|- align="center" bgcolor="#FFBBBB"
| 28 || 11 || @ Buffalo Sabres || 2 - 0 || 10-11-7
|- align="center" bgcolor="#CCFFCC"
| 29 || 14 || Calgary Flames || 5 - 2 || 11-11-7
|- align="center" bgcolor="#FFBBBB"
| 30 || 16 || @ New Jersey Devils || 6 - 3 || 11-12-7
|- align="center" bgcolor="#FFBBBB"
| 31 || 19 || @ Toronto Maple Leafs || 7 - 4 || 11-13-7
|- align="center" bgcolor="#FFBBBB"
| 32 || 23 || Carolina Hurricanes || 1 - 0 || 11-14-7
|- align="center" bgcolor="#CCFFCC"
| 33 || 26 || @ Carolina Hurricanes || 6 - 3 || 12-14-7
|- align="center" bgcolor="#FFBBBB"
| 34 || 30 || @ Phoenix Coyotes || 3 - 1 || 12-15-7
|- align="center" bgcolor="#CCFFCC"
| 35 || 31 || @ Colorado Avalanche || 6 - 3 || 13-15-7
|-

|- align="center" bgcolor="#CCFFCC"
| 36 || 2 || @ St. Louis Blues || 1 - 0 || 14-15-7
|- align="center" bgcolor="#CCFFCC"
| 37 || 4 || San Jose Sharks || 4 - 3 || 15-15-7
|- align="center" bgcolor="#FFBBBB"
| 38 || 6 || New Jersey Devils || 5 - 2 || 15-16-7
|- align="center" bgcolor="#FFBBBB"
| 39 || 7 || @ Washington Capitals || 5 - 1 || 15-17-7
|- align="center" bgcolor="#CCFFCC"
| 40 || 10 || Tampa Bay Lightning || 5 - 2 || 16-17-7
|- align="center" bgcolor="#CCFFCC"
| 41 || 13 || New York Islanders || 4 - 3 OT || 17-17-7
|- align="center" bgcolor="#FFBBBB"
| 42 || 15 || Chicago Blackhawks || 3 - 1 || 17-18-7
|- align="center" bgcolor="#FFBBBB"
| 43 || 16 || @ Montreal Canadiens || 3 - 0 || 17-19-7
|- align="center" bgcolor="#FFBBBB"
| 44 || 19 || Ottawa Senators || 2 - 1 || 17-20-7
|- align="center" bgcolor="#FFBBBB"
| 45 || 21 || Florida Panthers || 2 - 1 || 17-21-7
|- align="center" bgcolor="#CCFFCC"
| 46 || 26 || @ Washington Capitals || 4 - 1 || 18-21-7
|- align="center" bgcolor="#FFBBBB"
| 47 || 28 || @ Carolina Hurricanes || 3 - 2 OT || 18-22-7
|- align="center" bgcolor="#CCFFCC"
| 48 || 30 || @ Detroit Red Wings || 3 - 2 || 19-22-7
|-

|- align="center" bgcolor="#FFBBBB"
| 49 || 1 || Washington Capitals || 3 - 1 || 19-23-7
|- align="center" bgcolor="#CCFFCC"
| 50 || 4 || Vancouver Canucks || 8 - 4 || 20-23-7
|- align="center" bgcolor="#FFBBBB"
| 51 || 7 || @ Boston Bruins || 3 - 2 || 20-24-7
|- align="center" bgcolor="#FFBBBB"
| 52 || 12 || Carolina Hurricanes || 3 - 1 || 20-25-7
|- align="center" bgcolor="#FFBBBB"
| 53 || 14 || Detroit Red Wings || 4 - 2 || 20-26-7
|- align="center" bgcolor="#CCFFCC"
| 54 || 15 || @ Nashville Predators || 7 - 4 || 21-26-7
|- align="center" bgcolor="#FFBBBB"
| 55 || 17 || Montreal Canadiens || 6 - 3 || 21-27-7
|- align="center" bgcolor="#CCFFCC"
| 56 || 19 || Pittsburgh Penguins || 6 - 1 || 22-27-7
|- align="center" bgcolor="#CCFFCC"
| 57 || 21 || @ Edmonton Oilers || 2 - 1 OT || 23-27-7
|- align="center" bgcolor="#FFBBBB"
| 58 || 22 || @ Calgary Flames || 6 - 2 || 23-28-7
|- align="center" bgcolor="#CCFFCC"
| 59 || 26 || Phoenix Coyotes || 3 - 0 || 24-28-7
|- align="center" bgcolor="#CCFFCC"
| 60 || 28 || Philadelphia Flyers || 6 - 5 || 25-28-7
|-

|- align="center" bgcolor="white"
| 61 || 2 || Dallas Stars || 2 - 2 OT || 25-28-8
|- align="center" bgcolor="#CCFFCC"
| 62 || 4 || @ Washington Capitals || 4 - 2 || 26-28-8
|- align="center" bgcolor="#CCFFCC"
| 63 || 7 || @ Boston Bruins || 3 - 1 || 27-28-8
|- align="center" bgcolor="#CCFFCC"
| 64 || 8 || Toronto Maple Leafs || 3 - 2 OT || 28-28-8
|- align="center" bgcolor="#FFBBBB"
| 65 || 10 || Ottawa Senators || 3 - 0 || 28-29-8
|- align="center" bgcolor="#FFBBBB"
| 66 || 12 || Boston Bruins || 5 - 4 || 28-30-8
|- align="center" bgcolor="#CCFFCC"
| 67 || 14 || @ New York Islanders || 3 - 2 OT || 29-30-8
|- align="center" bgcolor="white"
| 68 || 15 || Washington Capitals || 1 - 1 OT || 29-30-9
|- align="center" bgcolor="#FFBBBB"
| 69 || 19 || Buffalo Sabres || 3 - 2 OT || 29-31-9
|- align="center" bgcolor="white"
| 70 || 21 || Pittsburgh Penguins || 2 - 2 OT || 29-31-10
|- align="center" bgcolor="#FFBBBB"
| 71 || 22 || @ Tampa Bay Lightning || 6 - 3 || 29-32-10
|- align="center" bgcolor="#CCFFCC"
| 72 || 24 || @ Florida Panthers || 2 - 1 || 30-32-10
|- align="center" bgcolor="#FFBBBB"
| 73 || 27 || @ Philadelphia Flyers || 3 - 1 || 30-33-10
|- align="center" bgcolor="#CCFFCC"
| 74 || 29 || New York Islanders || 3 - 1 || 31-33-10
|-

|- align="center" bgcolor="#FFBBBB"
| 75 || 2 || Mighty Ducks of Anaheim || 4 - 1 || 31-34-10
|- align="center" bgcolor="#FFBBBB"
| 76 || 4 || @ New Jersey Devils || 4 - 1 || 31-35-10
|- align="center" bgcolor="#CCFFCC"
| 77 || 5 || @ Philadelphia Flyers || 5 - 1 || 32-35-10
|- align="center" bgcolor="#FFBBBB"
| 78 || 8 || @ Chicago Blackhawks || 6 - 2 || 32-36-10
|- align="center" bgcolor="#FFBBBB"
| 79 || 9 || @ Dallas Stars || 3 - 1 || 32-37-10
|- align="center" bgcolor="#CCFFCC"
| 80 || 12 || Tampa Bay Lightning || 2 - 1 || 33-37-10
|- align="center" bgcolor="white"
| 81 || 15 || @ Ottawa Senators || 2 - 2 OT || 33-37-11
|- align="center" bgcolor="#FFBBBB"
| 82 || 18 || Pittsburgh Penguins || 2 - 1 OT || 33-38-11
|-

Player statistics
Skaters

Goaltenders

†Denotes player spent time with another team before joining Rangers. Stats reflect time with Rangers only.
‡Traded mid-season. Stats reflect time with Rangers only.

Awards and honors
 Wayne Gretzky, Lady Byng Trophy
 Wayne Gretzky, MVP of NHL All-Star Game

Draft picks
New York's picks at the 1998 NHL Entry Draft in Buffalo, New York at the Marine Midland Arena.

References
Bibliography
 
 Rangers on Hockey Database

New York Rangers seasons
New York Rangers
New York Rangers
New York Rangers
New York Rangers
1990s in Manhattan
Madison Square Garden